John Foreman may refer to:
 John Foreman (musician) (born 1972), Australian musician
 John Foreman (producer) (1925–1992), American film producer
 John Foreman (footballer) (1913–1964), English footballer

See also
 Jon Foreman (born 1976), lead singer of the band Switchfoot
 Jonathan Foreman (journalist) (born 1965), Anglo-American journalist and film critic
 John Forman (disambiguation)
 Jack Foreman Mantle (1917–1940), English recipient of the VC